Atlantic is a cinema in Warsaw, notable as the oldest cinema still operating in that city. It was opened to the public in 1930 as a luxurious cinema with expensive tickets. As the only cinema in Warsaw it survived the Warsaw Uprising and was refurbished after the war. In early 2000 it was reconstructed and currently houses 4 screens and 794 seats.

External links

Buildings and structures in Warsaw
Cinemas in Poland